Koonburra Creek is a stream in Far Western New South Wales, Australia.

The stream is between Broken Hill and White Cliffs, where the terrain is mostly a flat, arid landscape. The area is largely unpopulated, with habitation density less than 2 people per square kilometer.

References

Rivers of New South Wales
Far West (New South Wales)